Rose Eveleth is an American podcast host, producer, designer, and animator.  They helped launch and is a producer of ESPN Films' 30 for 30 podcast series, which was a Grand Award Gold Radio Winner in the narrative/documentary at the 2019 New York Festivals Radio Awards, as well as a Bronze Radio Winner in the sports category. 30 for 30 was also nominated for the 2018 Webby Awards in the features and best series categories.  Since 2015, Eveleth has become known for their Flash Forward podcast, receiving an MJ Bear Fellowship in 2016.

Biography
Eveleth graduated with a BSc in Ecology, Behavior and Evolution from the University of California San Diego (2010) and went on to earn a masters in Journalism Science (Health and Environmental Reporting) from New York University in 2011.

Eveleth started as a blogger and producer for The Doppler Effect, a weekly science show.  She spent five years as the Podcast Editor for Story Collider, a non-profit group dedicated to true, personal stories about science.

In 2013, together with Bora Zivkovic and Ben Lillie, Eveleth co-founded Science Studio, a first-of-its-kind project to collect multimedia stories about science in the manner of annual "year's best" compilations of reported and written stories. Since 2015, she has been a podcast host and producer for Flash Forward, a podcast about possible and not so possible futures.

On the occasion of Eveleth's MJ Bear Fellowship in 2016, the selection committee commented:

"Straddling the bright horizon between science and science fiction, Fast Forward is an engaging and informative podcast about how we live in and imagine the future. As creator and host of this solo project, Rose is not just shaping an imagined future, but her own. With Flash Forward she has shown creativity and flair, packaged with deep reporting, thoughtful engagement, and smart questioning. Most notably, among the gifts Rose offers journalism is imagination and a long view into the future."

Eveleth is also regarded as the first to complain about and draw attention to Scientist Dr Matt Taylor's shirt in what would become an international controversy. Dr Taylor wore a shirt depicting various scantily-clad women with firearms while delivering a progress report on the Rosetta comet mission, Eveleth commented on Twitter that this shirt had ruined the scientific achievement. This sparked international outrage with many arguing the shirt was sexist and a sign of how the STEM field's misogyny. The controversy ultimately culminated in a tearful apology from Dr Taylor with many believing the incident to be a better example of bullying and online targeted harassment. 

In 2019, the Swedish podcasting startup Acast included Flash Forward among the ad-free shows it features for a small charge.

Awards
 2016, MJ Bear Fellowship from the Online News Association
 2019, Grant Award Gold Radio Winner, narrative/documentary category, New York Festivals Radio Awards
 2019, Bronze Radio Winner, sports category, New York Festivals Radio Awards

References

External links
Biography on Rose Eveleth's website
Rose Eveleth's profile on LinkedIn

American women podcasters
American podcasters
21st-century American journalists
American women journalists
Living people
University of California, San Diego alumni
New York University alumni
Year of birth missing (living people)
21st-century American women